Robert Acclom was an English politician who was MP for Scarborough in 1401 and October 1404. He was the son of John Acclom.

References

English MPs 1401
English MPs October 1404
15th-century English politicians
Politicians from Scarborough, North Yorkshire